Ellenhausen ist eine Ortsgemeinde – a community belonging to a Verbandsgemeinde – in the Westerwaldkreis in Rhineland-Palatinate, Germany. The community belongs to the Verbandsgemeinde of Selters, a kind of collective municipality.

Geography

History
In 1100, Ellenhausen had its first documentary mention. The name's spelling changed over the centuries from Elkinhusin to Helchinhusin to Ellenhausen. In 1972, in the course of administrative reforms, the Verbandsgemeinde of Selters was founded.

Politics

The municipal council is made up of 8 council members, including the honorary and presiding mayor (Ortsbürgermeister), who were elected in a majority vote in a municipal election on 7 June 2009.

Economy and infrastructure

The nearest Autobahn interchange is Mogendorf on the A 3 (Cologne–Frankfurt). The nearest InterCityExpress stop is the railway station at Montabaur on the Cologne-Frankfurt high-speed rail line.

References

External links
 Ellenhausen 

Municipalities in Rhineland-Palatinate
Westerwaldkreis